Chuqi Pirwa (Aymara chuqi gold, pirwa, piwra granary, Quechua chuqi,  metal, every kind of precious metal; gold (<Aymara), pirwa deposit, "gold granary" or "metal deposit", Hispanicized spelling Choque Pirhua) is a mountain in the Andes of Peru, about  high. It is located in the Arequipa Region, Caylloma Province, Tisco District, and in the Espinar Province, Yauri District. It lies northeast of Jañuma Pirwa and east of Pirwa.

The Pirwamayu (Quechua for "granary river") originates west of the mountain. It flows to the southwest and south as a right affluent of the Qullqa River.

References

Mountains of Peru
Mountains of Arequipa Region
Mountains of Cusco Region